The Siligir is a river in Yakutia (Sakha Republic), Russia. It is the largest right tributary of the Olenyok with a length of  — long counting the Orto-Siligir stretch of its upper course.

The river flows just north of the Arctic Circle across a lonely, desolate area of Olenyoksky District devoid of settlements. There are very large bitumen deposits along the Siligir basin.

Course  
The river flows initially northwards, bending to the NNE after a stretch, and then to the northeast. Finally it bends again to the north and meets the right bank of the Olenyok  from its mouth. The confluence is downstream of Olenyok village, one of the few inhabited localities of the area. The river is frozen between early October and the second half of May.

Tributaries 

Fauna
The main fish species found in the waters of the Siligir are lenok, taimen, grayling, pike and perch. In some stretches there are whitefish and nelma.

See also
List of rivers of Russia
Oil sands

References

External links 
Рыбалка май 2019 река Силигир ( Fishing in the Siligir river Part 1) 
Fishing & Tourism in Yakutia
Map of the sedimentary basins of the Siberian platform, Russia. Main heavy-oil and bitumen deposit locations

Rivers of the Sakha Republic
Central Siberian Plateau
Tributaries of the Olenyok